The Episcopal Diocese of Central Ecuador is a missionary church of the Anglican Communion for the interior region of Ecuador with headquarters in Quito.  It forms part of Province IX of the Episcopal Church.  The current bishop is Juan Carlos Quiñonez Mera. He was consecrated on May 17, 2022 in the Catedra de El Senor in Quito..

Bishops
 Adrián D. Caceres (1970-1990)
 Neptalí Larrea Moreno (1990-2004) 
 Wilfrido Ramos-Orench (2007-2009) (Provisional)
 Luis Fernando Ruiz (2009-2011) 
Victor A. Scantlebury (2011-2020) (Acting)
 Juan Carlos Quiñonez, (2022-present)

Anglicanism in South America
Protestantism in Ecuador
Central Ecuador
Religious organisations based in Ecuador
Province 9 of the Episcopal Church (United States)